Young Painters of the World was a one-month long residency program which was organized by International Association of Art and supported by UNESCO to promote interchange between young artists from all over the world and improve their social status. The first program was held in Paris from October 2 to 28 in 1961 by the French National Committee of IAA. A selected young artist under age of 30 as a representative of his or her country had the qualification for participation. They were provided accommodation, meals and transportation during the program. Because lack of data, it is not clear yet how often the program was held by each national committee of IAA in rotation and until when it was managed in relation to UNESCO.

Historical background

A UNESCO initiative, 1948 

The general conference of UNESCO at its third session, held in Beirut Lebanon during November in 1948, accepted the initiative of the freedom of artists. The director general Sir Julian Huxley was instructed:

Preparing for the International Conference of Artists, the director general Jaime Torres Bodet felt the need to consult member states about associations of arts in their own countries. He had an official enquiry letter(CL/497) sent to each member state on April 5, 1951 in order to ask:

Based on the responses from 22 out of the 25 contacted countries and the secondary responses from 44 national associations of artists in 17 countries, the general conference of UNESCO at its Sixth Session, held in Paris during June and July 1951, adopted the following resolution:

The International Conference of Artists, 1952  
The first International Conference of Artists was held in Venice, Italy from September 22 to 28 in 1952. Its reports were supposedly submitted to the 7th General Conference of UNESCO in November of the same year but the copy of the report is not preserved at UNESCO archives. However, an anthology of essays and statements collected by UNESCO at that time was published under the title 《The Artist in Modern Society》 in 1954.

The International Association of Plastic Arts, 1954 
Right after the initial Conference in Venice, a preparatory committee was organized with a chairman Gino Severini. Finally, the 8th General Conference of UNESCO held in Montevideo of Uruguay in November 1954 admitted the International Association of Plastic Arts() as observers and decided on increasing its subvention for the association.

The establishment of the International Association of Art((IAA/AIAP) dates back to an initiative launched in 1948 in Beirut's Third General Conference of UNESCO to set up a permanent forum of international visual artists to support UNESCO's goals. The sixth UNESCO conference in 1951 commissioned its Secretary-General to convene an international congress of artists, which was finally held in Venice in 1952. The 23 national governments represented there and 48 artists' associations from 19 countries agreed on the goal of founding an international umbrella organization for sculptors, painters and engravers. Chaired by the Italian painter Gino Severini, a Transitional Council has been set up and a secretariat in Paris. Finally, in 1954, the founding assembly of the IAA / AIAP was held in Venice, attended by already formed national committees from 18 countries as full members, as well as observers from another 22 countries. Since then membership has grown to over 90 National Committees worldwide, divided into five world regions. Since its foundation, the IAA / AIAP has had the official status of a consultative organization of UNESCO.

Young Painters of the World 

 
 
 

Young Painters of the World was a sort of residency program for young artists under 30 age from member countries of UNESCO. It was supported by UNESCO and organized by each national committee of IAA/AIAP in terns. Because of the lack of archive material, it is not clear who brought up the idea first, and when and where it started. According to Park Seo-Bo who participated in Young Painters of the World in Paris in 1961, the 1961 one held by the French committee seems to have been the beginning. Based on his interview and the material he presented, it was almost a one-month long program which consists of workshop, tours, seminar, a group exhibition and an art contest among the participants. According to the private letter written in 1965 from Kim Tschang-yeul to Park Seo-bo, it is sure that another Young Painters of the World was organized by the U.K committee of IAA/AIAP and held in London in 1965.

Young Painters of the World in Paris, 1961 

It was announced to each national committee of IAA/AIAP in 1960 that Young Painters of the World in Paris() would run from January 2 to 28 in 1961. However, the French committee changed the date to hold it in parallel with the 2nd Paris Biennale() scheduled to open on September 28 in the same year. The notice of was delivered in November by post to each national committee. It was scheduled again from October 2 to 28 in 1961. However, some countries didn't get the letter so that their representative artists arrived in Paris on January next year only to find themselves way ahead of the actual schedule. One of them was Park Seo-Bo, who had to wait for 10 months.

According to Park Seo-Bo's interview, there were some participants who could not speak French nor English like himself. Because translators were not provided, they didn't communicate fully even at conference but they shared the printed handouts of reports each participant was supposed to present either in French or English. They visited together the tomb of Vincent van Gogh at Auvers-sur-Oise on a tour bus and had a group show in Compiègne from October 21 to 22 during the program. The participants were told to submit into the contest two pieces of art work created on the subject of the emerging new town Sarcelles near Paris. Park Seo-Bo got the first prize for his landscape with oils, Flavio Paolucci from Switzerland got the second, and Adolf Frohner from Austria the third.

The participant countries and artists  

According to the brochure of the group exhibition in Compiègne which Park Seo-Bo has kept, at least 27 young artists from 24 member countries came to Paris to participate in the programme. There was only one female artist among the 27, who was the national representative of the U.K. It was the rule that each country sent one artist, but three artists represented France and two came from Spain. The youngest participant was the one from Australia, and there were some who were older than the age limit of 30.

Young Painters of the World in London, 1965 

Another Young Painters of the World was organized by the U.K committee of IAA/AIAP and held in London in 1965. Kim Tschang-yeul was selected for that program as the Korean representative.

References

External links 
 The Webpage of IAA/IAAP
 UNESCO Digital Library

Arts organizations